Nucleolar GTP-binding protein 2 is a protein that in humans is encoded by the GNL2 gene.

References

Further reading